Cunningham is a rural locality in the Southern Downs Region, Queensland, Australia. In the  Cunningham had a population of 66 people.

History
The locality is named after explorer and botanist Allan Cunningham who was the first European to see the lush pastures of the Darling Downs in 1827.

In the  Cunningham had a population of 66 people.

Geography
The Condamine River forms the north-eastern boundary of the locality. The Cunningham Highway passes through the locality in an approximately east-west direction and forms part of the southern boundary. The South Western railway line passes through the locality from the north-east to the south-west. The land is mostly used for farming. There is a small urban centre on the Leyburn-Cunningham Road which features the Country Women's Association Memorial Hall at Cunningham Road, a memorial park and the now disused Cunningham railway station.

Amenities

The memorial park has a picnic table as well as three memorials to (left to right):
 Patrick Leslie, the first settler on the Darling Downs who founded Toolburra Station north of the park
 the local servicemen who died in World War I and World War II
 the pioneer families of the district: Clancy, Mullins, McMahon and Cantwell

The memorial cairn to Patrick Leslie was erected by the Rosenthal Shire Council and unveiled on 10 December 1959 by the Shire Chairman, J. A. Costello.

The Cunningham branch of the Queensland Country Women's Association meets at the QCWA Hall on Cunningham Road.

References

External links

Southern Downs Region
Localities in Queensland